The 2004 Indian general election in Kerala were held for 20 Lok Sabha seats in the state.
The result was an overwhelming victory for the Left Democratic Front (LDF) which won 15 seats. Indian National Congress, who had won 8 seats in the 1999 elections, won none this election. The other 5 seats were won by Kerala Congress (1), P.C. Thomas's Indian Federal Democratic Party (1), Indian Union Muslim League (1), Janata Dal (Secular) (1), and by an LDF supported Independent candidate (1).

In the aftermath of this election, the then Chief Minister of the state A. K. Antony resigned taking sole responsibility for the INC's poor electoral performance. Despite this, the outside support from the Left Front proved valuable for Congress to have a stable government in the Lok Sabha for the next 5 years.

List of elected MPs

Results

By alliance 

 Note: 
 UPA was not in existence in 1999, instead the number of seats won in 1999 represents the seats won by Indian National Congress
 UDF, is a coalition in Kerala, that was formed in 2001, that includes the Indian National Congress, and splinter Congress groups in Kerala.
 Left front, was not part of the UPA, in 2004, instead gave outside support.
 P. C. Thomas's Indian Federal Democratic Party, later merged with Kerala Congress and the United Democratic Front.

By Party

By constituency

2005 By-election 
Due to the death of the sitting MP P. K. Vasudevan Nair, Trivandrum constituency went to bypolls. Turnout for the election was 68.15%

Notes

References

Kerala
Indian general elections in Kerala
2000s in Kerala